Calophyllum nubicola is a species of flowering plant in the Calophyllaceae family. It is found only in Panama. It is threatened by habitat loss.

References

Endemic flora of Panama
Endangered plants
nubicola
Taxonomy articles created by Polbot